Phostria dohrnii is a moth in the family Crambidae. It was described by Snellen in 1881. It is found in Colombia, Costa Rica and Panama.

The fore- and hindwings are yellow, the former with the costal margin brownish-yellow and the apex broadly purplish-brown, as well as two lines crossing the wing from the costal to the inner margin and a small brown dot in the cell. The apex and outer margin of the hindwings are purplish-brown and there is a large U-shaped brown mark extending from the costal margin across the wing from near the lower side of which a waved line extends to the inner margin.

References

Phostria
Moths described in 1881
Moths of Central America
Moths of South America